The Aerotrain is an automated people mover system located within the Kuala Lumpur International Airport in Malaysia.

Opened in 1998 along with the airport, the Aerotrain system consists of two stations, one in the Main Terminal Building and the other in Satellite Building A. The system is the only means of transport for passengers between the two terminals.

Upgrading works on the Aerotrain had caused the service to be suspended between 1 November 2010 and 15 March 2011. Passengers were transferred between the Main Terminal Building and the Satellite Building by bus shuttles during the upgrading period. The Aerotrain in KLIA has been plagued by operational and maintenance issues.

General information 
The Aerotrain is fully automated and driverless. Usually, two trains ply between the two stations. In accordance with the Spanish solution, when the train reaches the platform, the exit doors will open first for passengers to disembark, after which the entrance door on the other side will open.

Part of the train track goes underground to cross the taxiway. The ride between the Main Terminal Building and Satellite Terminal A takes about 2.5 minutes.

The Aerotrain supported various operating modes such as Synchronized Double Shuttle Mode, Offset synchronized Double Shuttle Mode, Unsynchronized Double Shuttle Mode, Single Shuttle Mode, On-Call Mode, Test Train Mode and Out Of Service Mode. The Aerotrain has 4 major sub-systems, namely the Central Control System, Vehicle System, Station Automatic Train Operation (ATO) System and Power Distribution System (PDS).

The maintenance of the Aerotrain is scheduled at 10am-12pm and 12am-5am everyday, when only one of the trains will be running for operation and the other one will undergo maintenance works and safety checks. The frequency of the train decreases from every 21⁄2 minutes to every 5 minutes during the maintenance periods.

Rolling stock 
The rolling stock is manufactured by Adtranz (merged with Bombardier Transportation in 2001) and comprises 3 CX-100 trains with 3 cars per train (originally 2 cars), of which each car has a capacity of 249. A  DC electric motor (model number: 1460-P4, controlled by a thyristor drive) constitutes the propulsion system of the trains.

On 15 March 2011, a new train was added to the fleet which is known as Train 3. The addition is made to cover the shortfall of the Aerotrain system when either Train 1 or Train 2 is scheduled for an overhaul programme. The overhaul programme is necessary as both Train 1 and Train 2 has been in use for 13 years.

On 28 December 2021, a local engineering firm, Pestech International Bhd has secured the Kuala Lumpur International Airport (KLIA) Aerotrain project for RM742.95 million, which involves the upgrade of the 1.2 km automated people mover system at the airport, together with the Aerotrain's operations and maintenance, for a 10-year period from 2025 to 2034. The package includes a replacement of the existing CX-100 rolling stock with the Innovia APM 300.

Incidents 
On 25 December 2017, one of the trains broke down in between the two terminals and a detrainment was carried out. This left the aerotrain running on a single train and free shuttle buses were provided.

On 1 March 2023, the service was suspended until further notice. This is due to an incident where the aerotrain service broke down due to mechanical and electronic failures, resulting in 114 passengers being stranded mid-way on the tracks.

Gallery

See also 
 List of airport people mover systems

References

External links 
KLIA Aerotrain

1998 establishments in Malaysia
Kuala Lumpur International Airport
Rail transport in Selangor
Airport people mover systems
Innovia people movers
People mover systems in Malaysia
Zero-fare transport services